Deni Fiorentini (born 5 June 1984 in Split, Croatia) is a Croatian-Italian water polo player. Until 2006 he was part of Croatia men's national water polo team. He has dual Italian and Croatian citizenship. At the 2012 Summer Olympics, he competed for the Italy men's national water polo team in the men's event. His father Branko Jovanović used to play for POŠK and Yugoslavia men's national water polo team. His brother Goran was also a water polo player.

See also
 Italy men's Olympic water polo team records and statistics
 List of Olympic medalists in water polo (men)
 List of world champions in men's water polo
 List of World Aquatics Championships medalists in water polo

References

External links
 
 
 
 

1984 births
Living people
Water polo players from Split, Croatia
Croatian male water polo players
Italian male water polo players
Water polo centre backs
Water polo players at the 2012 Summer Olympics
Medalists at the 2012 Summer Olympics
Olympic silver medalists for Italy in water polo
World Aquatics Championships medalists in water polo